A transition metal nitrate complex is a coordination compound containing one or more nitrate ligands.  Such complexes are common starting reagents for the preparation of other compounds.

Ligand properties
Being the conjugate base of a strong acid (nitric acid, pKa = -1.4), nitrate has modest Lewis basicity. Two coordination modes are common: unidentate and bidentate. Often, bidentate nitrate, denoted κ2-NO3, is bound unsymmetrically in the sense that one M-O distance is clearly bonding and the other is more weakly interacting. The MO-N distances for the coordinated oxygen are longer by about 10 picometers longer than the N-Oterminal bonds.  This observation suggests that the terminal N-O bonds have double bond character.  Nitrate is isostructural with but less basic than carbonate.  Both exhibit comparable coordination geometries. The nitrogen center of nitrate does not form bonds to metals.

Coordination complexes
With three terminal oxide groups, nitrate can in principle bind metals through many geometries.  Even though the ligand is written as MNO3, the oxygen atoms are invariably coordinated.  Thus,  monodentate nitrate is illustrated by [Co(NH3)5NO3]2+, which could also be written as  [Co(NH3)5ONO2]2+. Homoleptic metal nitrate complexes generally have O,O'-bidentate nitrate ligands.

Hydrates
Typical metal nitrates are hydrated.  Some of these salts crystallize with one or more nitrate ligands, but most are assumed to dissolve in water to give aquo complexes, often of the stoichiometry [M(H2O)6]n+.

Cr(NO3)3(H2O)6
Mn(NO3)2(H2O)4
Fe(NO3)3(H2O)9
Co(NO3)2(H2O)2
Ni(NO3)2(H2O)4 
Pd(NO3)2(H2O)2
Cu(NO3)2(H2O)x
Zn(NO3)2(H2O)4
Hg2(NO3)2(H2O)2

Synthesis
For routine use, most metal nitrates can be prepared by the dissolving metal oxides or metal carbonates in nitric acid.  The main complication with dissolving metals in nitric acid arises from redox reactions, which can afford either nitric oxide or nitrogen dioxide.

Anhydrous nitrates can be prepared by the oxidation of metals with dinitrogen tetroxide (often as a mixture with nitrogen dioxide, with which it interconverts). N2O4 undergoes molecular autoionization to give [NO+] [NO3−], with the former nitrosonium ion being a strong oxidant. The method is illustrated by the route to β-Cu(NO3)2:

Cu + 2N2O4 → Cu(NO3)2 + 2NO

Many metals, metal halides, and metal carbonyls undergo similar reactions, but the product formulas can be deceptive. For example from chromium one obtains Cr(NO3)3(N2O4)2, which was shown to be the salt (NO+)2[Cr(NO3)5]2-. Nitrogen oxides readily interconvert between various forms, some of which may act as completing ligands. The redox reaction of nitrosonium and the metal can give rise to nitrogen oxide which forms strong metal nitrosyl complexes; nitronium ions (NO2+) are similarly obversed.

Reactions
Given nitrate's low basicity, the tendency of metal nitrate complexes toward hydrolysis is expected.  Thus copper(II) nitrate readily dissociates in aqueous solution to give the aqua complex:
Cu(NO3)2 +  6 H2O → [Cu(H2O)6](NO3)2

Pyrolysis of metal nitrates yields oxides.  
Ni(NO3)2  →  NiO  +  NO2  +  0.5O2
This reaction is used to impregnate oxide supports with nickel oxides.

Nitrate reductase enzymes convert nitrate to nitrite.  The mechanism involves the intermediacy of Mo-ONO2 complexes.

References

Nitrates